Love in Goa is a 1983 Indian Hindi film, directed by  Harsh Kohli. The film stars Ashok Kumar, Om Prakash, Mayur Verma and Anuradha Patel in the leading roles. The musical score of the film was done by Bappi Lahiri & Alfred Rose.

Plot 
The film revolves around the teenage love story of a Catholic girl from Goa and a Hindu boy.

Cast 
 Ashok Kumar as Baburao
 Om Prakash as Vinayak Rao
 Mayur Verma as Raja "Raju"
 Anuradha Patel as Marina D'Souza 
 Om Shivpuri as Jack D'Souza
 Mohan Sherry as Marshall Lobo
 Gajanan Jagirdar as Mr. D'Souza
 Ashalata Wabgaonkar as Mary D'Souza
 Raju Shrestha as Tiktik D'Souza

Soundtrack 
The lyrics were penned by Anjaan and the songs were composed by Bappi Lahiri and Alfred Rose.

 The song "Come On Sing" was lyrics & music by Alfred Rose. The rest songs were lyrics by Anjaan & music by Bappi Lahiri.

References

External links 

 

1983 films
1980s Hindi-language films
Films scored by Bappi Lahiri